Sampson "Gaddafi" Lamptey is a Ghanaian former footballer who played as a defender. He was part of the Ghana squad that won the 1982 African Cup of Nations. He was included in the competition's Team of the Tournament.

Honours 
Ghana

 African Cup of Nations: 1982

Individual

 African Cup of Nations Team of the Tournament: 1982

References 

Year of birth missing (living people)
Living people
Ghanaian footballers
Association football defenders
Accra Hearts of Oak S.C. players
Ghana Premier League players
Ghana international footballers
1982 African Cup of Nations players
Africa Cup of Nations-winning players